Do Do Sol Sol La La Sol is a South Korean television series starring Go Ara, Lee Jae-wook, and Kim Joo-hun. It was scheduled to premiere on KBS2 and Netflix on August 26, 2020. However, KBS postponed its premiere date to prevent the spread of COVID-19. The series aired from October 7 to November 26, 2020, every Wednesday and Thursday at 21:30 (KST).

Synopsis 
A romantic-comedy about an energetic and cheerful pianist named Goo Ra-ra. She lost everything she had in a sudden, turning her lucky rich life to rags. While trying to rebuild her new life, she meet a mysterious, warm-hearted multi part-time worker guy named Sunwoo Joon. Since their unpredictable meeting, Sunwoo Joon tends to help Goo Ra-ra by paying for her life cost and even build a small place for piano lesson course called 'Lala Land' in order to make Goo Ra-ra get back on her feet. 
They get involved together with the people at countryside in a small city, called Eunpo City.
This is the place where their secrets, pain, stories, and reason behind Sunwoo Jun's thoughtful acts towards Goo Ra-ra slowly started to leak out.

Cast

Main 

 Go Ara as Goo Ra-ra
Park So-yi as young Ra-ra  
 Man-su's only daughter and heiress of Ra-ra Cosmetics, a down-on-her-luck but optimistic pianist whose talent of seeing the best in people and any situation brightens and touches the lives of those around her.
 Lee Jae-wook as Sunwoo Joon
Shim Ji-wan as young Joon
 A mysterious and aloof albeit good looking and warm-hearted  soul who has his own secrets and pains. While he keeps and maintains his distant demeanor from others, always showing his best level of alpha power, he finds himself instantly drawn, captivated and hooked by  Goo Ra-ra's positive and childlike charms.
 Kim Joo-hun as Cha Eun-seok
 An orthopedic surgeon feeling the effects of Burnout Syndrome. He is a voice and presence that could instantly inspire trust - or not - from others. A divorcee, who was once a piano talent. He also finds himself drawn to Goo Ra-ra, marvelling at her simplicity, energy and warm personality.

Supporting

Eunpo residents 
 Ye Ji-won as Jin Sook-kyeong, Ha-young's mother and owner of the Jin's Beauty Salon
 Shin Eun-soo as Jin Ha-yeong, Sook-kyeong's daughter
 Yoon Jong-bin as Lee Seung-gi (name after a famous ballad singer), Ha-young's best friend who secretly likes her
 Lee Soon-jae as Kim Man-bok, old man who does various jobs around Eunpo
  as Shin Jae-min, a child prodigy who can play piano just by listening the music
 Park Sung-yeon as Seung-gi's mother, Sook-kyeong's friend and customer at Jin's Beauty Salon
 Lee Seon-hee as Ye-seo's mother, Sook-kyeong's friend and customer at Jin's Beauty Salon
 Kim Jung-yeon as Mi-ran, Sook-kyeong's friend and customer at Jin's Beauty Salon

People around Sunwoo Joon 

 Seo Yi-sook as Jo Yoon-sil, Joon's overprotective mother
 Choi Kwang-il as Sunwoo Myung, Joon's father
 Lee Si-woo as Kim Ji-hoon, Sunwoo Joon's friend
 Kwon Eun-bin as Jung Ga-yeong

People around Goo Ra-ra 
Um Hyo-sup as Goo Man-su, Goo Ra-ra's father and President of Rara Cosmetics
Moon Hee-kyung as Gong Mi-sook, a professor who taught Ra-ra piano from her childhood to college with passion and sincerity
Ahn Nae-sang as Secretary Moon, Man-su's secretary, he disappeared after the bankruptcy of Rara Cosmetics
 Moon Tae-yoo as Bang Jeong-nam, Ra-ra's ex-fiancé and Eun-seok's junior at medical school
 Jeon Soo-kyeong as Im Ja-kyung, Jeong-nam's mother
  as Kim Si-ah, Ra-ra's university friend

Others 
 Choi Kwang-je as Chu Min-su, a private detective who is looking for Joon
 Lee Soo-mi as Oh Young-joo as Eun-seok's ex-wife
 Kang Hyung-seok as Ahn Joong-ho, a mysterious fellow in Eunpo
 Kim Bum-suk as Detective Kang Min-guk

Production 
The drama is helmed by director Kim Min-kyung and penned by screenwriter Oh Ji-young, who wrote Shopaholic Louis (2016) and My Secret, Terrius (2018).

The first script reading took place early May 2020 in South Korea.

The series was originally scheduled to premiere on August 26, 2020. However, one of the cast member Heo Dong-won was tested positive for COVID-19 and as a preventative measure, KBS halted all production activities until further notice. The series resumed filming on September 1, 2020 after the cast members tested negative.

Original soundtrack

Part 1

Part 2

Part 3

Part 4

Part 5

Part 6

Part 7

Part 8

Part 9

Part 10

Part 11

Part 12

Part 13

Part 14

Part 15

Part 16

Classical music quoted 
 Episode 1
 Twelve Variations on "Ah vous dirai-je, Maman", nursery rhyme arr. W.A. Mozart.
 Grande valse Brilliante in E-flat, Op. 18, by Chopin.
 La Campanella by Franz Liszt.
 Sonatine (Mouvement de Menuet), by Ravel. 
 Six Moments Musicaux, by Rachmaninoff.
 Episode 2
 Twelve Variations on "Ah vous dirai-je, Maman", nursery rhyme arr. W.A. Mozart.
 Je te veux, by Erik Satie. Arranged for clarinet, piano, and cello.
 Episode 3
 Prelude & Fugue 2 in c minor by J.S. Bach
 Prelude No 1 in C major from the Well-tempered Clavier by J.S. Bach
 Goldberg variations (Aria da capo) by J.S. Bach
 Pathétique piano sonata in c minor by Ludwig van Beethoven
 Prelude in D from the Well-tempered Clavier by J.S. Bach
 Toccata and Fugue in d minor by J.S. Bach
 A maiden's prayer by Tekla Bądarzewska-Baranowska
 Episode 4
 Je te veux, by Erik Satie. Arranged for solo piano.
 Etude in C major no 1, Opus 10 by Frédéric Chopin

Ratings

Awards and nominations

References

External links 
  
 
 
 

2020 South Korean television series debuts
2020 South Korean television series endings
Korean Broadcasting System television dramas
South Korean romantic comedy television series
Television productions suspended due to the COVID-19 pandemic
Television series by Monster Union
Korean-language Netflix exclusive international distribution programming